Ugolini may refer to:

Places 
 Ugolini Peak

People 
 Agostino Ugolini (1755–1824)
 Giovanni Francesco Ugolini (born 1953)
 Loredano Ugolini (born 1927)
 Luigi Ugolini (1891–1980)
 Luigi Maria Ugolini (1895–1936)
 Massimo Andrea Ugolini (born 1978)
 Rolando Ugolini (1924–2014)
 Vincenzo Ugolini (1580s–1638)